Elena is a dramma per musica in a prologue and three acts by Francesco Cavalli, set to a libretto originally by Giovanni Faustini that was completed by Nicolò Minato. The opera was first performed in Venice at the Teatro San Cassiano; the dedication is dated to 26 December 1659.

Recordings
live Aix-en-Provence Festival, July 2013. DVD - conductor Leonardo García Alarcón, director Jean-Yves Ruf. Ricercar

References

Sources

Operas
Operas by Francesco Cavalli
1659 operas
Opera world premieres at the Teatro San Cassiano
Italian-language operas